The American Colonies Act 1766 (6 Geo. III c 12), commonly known as the Declaratory Act, was an Act of the Parliament of Great Britain which accompanied the repeal of the Stamp Act 1765 and the amendment of the Sugar Act. Parliament repealed the Stamp Act because boycotts were hurting British trade and used the declaration to justify the repeal and save face. The declaration stated that the Parliament's authority was the same in America as in Britain and asserted Parliament's authority to pass laws that were binding on the American colonies.

Background
Representatives from a number of the Thirteen Colonies assembled as the Stamp Act Congress in response to the Stamp Act 1765, to call into question the right of a distant power to tax them without proper representation. The British Parliament was then faced with colonies who refused to comply with their Act. This, combined with protests that had occurred in the colonies and, more importantly, protests which had arisen in Great Britain from manufacturers who were suffering from the colonies' non-importation agreement, all led to the repeal of the Stamp Act. Normally the economic activity in the colonies would not have caused such an outcry, but the British economy was still experiencing a post-war depression from the Seven Years' War. Another reason for repeal of the Stamp Act was the replacement of George Grenville, the Prime Minister who had enacted the Stamp Acts, by Charles Watson-Wentworth, 2nd Marquess of Rockingham. Rockingham was more favourable towards the colonies and furthermore he was antagonistic towards policies that Grenville had enacted. Rockingham invited Benjamin Franklin to speak to Parliament about colonial policy and he portrayed the colonists as in opposition to internal taxes (which were derived from internal colonial transactions) such as the Stamp Act called for, but not external taxes (which were duties laid on imported commodities). Parliament then agreed to repeal the Stamp Act on the condition that the Declaratory Act was passed. On March 18, 1766, Parliament repealed the Stamp Act and passed the Declaratory Act.

The Act 
The Declaratory Act proclaimed that Parliament "had hath, and of right ought to have, full power and authority to make laws and statutes of sufficient force and validity to bind the colonies and people of America ... in all cases whatsoever". The phrasing of the act was intentionally unambiguous. In other words, the Declaratory Act of 1766 asserted that Parliament had the absolute power to make laws and changes to the colonial government,  "in all cases whatsoever", even though the colonists were not represented in the Parliament.

Reaction
Although many in Parliament felt that taxes were implied in this clause, other members of Parliament and many of the colonists—who were busy celebrating what they saw as their political victory—did not. Other colonists, however, were outraged because the Declaratory Act hinted that more acts would be coming. This Declaratory Act was copied almost word for word from the Irish Declaratory Act, an Act which had placed Ireland in a position of bondage to the Crown, implying that the same fate would come to The Thirteen Colonies. However, the colonists never explicitly called for its repeal, and would seek reconciliation with the Crown up until the last minute.

The political theorist Edward Mims described the American reaction to the Declaratory Act:

Legacy
Following the passage of the Act, the British Parliament never again attempted directly impose taxation upon any of its colonies, or overseas territories, except for the Taxation of Colonies Act 1778 which was passed during the American Revolution.

Even after the recognition of the independence of the United States, the Act continued to remain in force for the remaining colonies of the British Empire in the western hemisphere. 

The Act was repealed in 1964, with the handful of remaining British colonies in the West Indies already governed by constitutions explicitly granted under the authority of Parliament, and in particular by the West Indies Act 1962. Though, whenever the British government perceived a need for colonial contributions towards the defence of the Empire, it appealed to the colonial governments themselves to make those contributions, with varying levels of success.

See also
 American Revolutionary War for the Declaratory Act among post-1763 revenue bills.
 British Empire
 Colonial America
 Townshend Acts
 Charles Watson-Wentworth, 2nd Marquess of Rockingham
 George Grenville

Notes

Citations

External links

 Text of Act Repealing the Stamp Act

Great Britain Acts of Parliament 1766
1766 in the Thirteen Colonies
History of the British Isles
Laws leading to the American Revolution